Hemiphlebiidae is a family of damselflies, it contains only one extant species, the ancient greenling, native to Southern Australia and Tasmania. The fossil record of the group extends back to the Late Jurassic, making them the oldest known crown group damselflies.

Taxonomy 

 †Burmahemiphlebia Zheng et al. 2017 Burmese amber, Myanmar, Late Cretaceous (Cenomanian) 99 Ma
 †Electrohemiphlebia Lak et al. 2009 Charentese Amber, France, Cretaceous (Albian-Cenomanian)  105-99 Ma
 †Enteropia Pritykina and Vassilenko 2014 Shar Teg, Mongolia, Late Jurassic (Tithonian) 145 Ma.
 Hemiphlebia Selys, 1869, Australia, Extant.
 †Jordanhemiphlebia Kaddumi 2009  Jordanian Amber, Jordan, Early Cretaceous (Albian) 112.6 to 99.7 Ma
†Jurahemiphlebia Bechly, 2019 Solnhofen Limestone, Germany, Late Jurassic (Tithonian) 145 Ma.
 †Kachinhemiphlebia Zheng 2020 Burmese amber, Myanmar, Late Cretaceous (Cenomanian) 99 Ma
 †Mersituria Vasilenko 2005 Doronino Formation, Russia, Early Cretaceous (Barremian) 130 to 125 Ma.
 †Pantelusa Vassilenko 2014 Ora Formation, Israel, Late Cretaceous (Turonian) 94.3 - 89.3 Ma
 †Parahemiphlebia Jarzembowski et al. 1998 Durlston Formation, United Kingdom Early Cretaceous (Berriasian) 145-140 Ma Crato Formation, Brazil Early Cretaceous (Aptian) 122-112 Ma.
 †Thairia Felker and Vasilenko 2018  Doronino Formation, Russia, Early Cretaceous (Barremian) 130 to 125 Ma.

References

Odonata families
Lestoidea
Odonata of Australia
Taxa named by Clarence Hamilton Kennedy